Vincent Keymer (born 15 November 2004) is a German chess grandmaster, and a young chess prodigy who was runner-up at the World Rapid Chess Championship 2022 behind Magnus Carlsen.

Chess Career
Vincent Keymer was born in Mainz, Germany, a city that has a long history of hosting rapid tournaments and Chess960 tournaments. He learned chess from his parents at the age of five. In 2015 and 2017 he became European champion with the German U18 national chess team.

Garry Kasparov in 2016 referred to Keymer as "exceptional", and Keymer at 11 demonstrated his potential with an "impressive second prize" in a strong field in the Vienna Open tournament.

In July 2017, Keymer obtained the third and final norm required for the title of International Master.

He has been coached by Peter Leko of Hungary, who was himself once considered "the world's most promising prodigy".

From 29 March to 2 April 2018, Keymer played in the A group of the Grenke Chess Open as 99th seed. He won the tournament ahead of 49 grandmasters, including four grandmasters with Elo ratings above 2700, scoring 8/9 and achieving his first norm for the title of Grandmaster at age 13. He earned one-and-a-half more points than required for the GM norm. Leonard Barden noted that Keymer's  (2798) was the highest in history by an under-14 player, and The Week in Chess said Keymer's performance was "one of the most sensational results of all time."

From 10 October through 21 October 2019, Keymer played in the 2019 FIDE Grand Swiss Tournament, scoring 4½/11 (+1−3=7). This performance earned him his third and final norm required for the title of Grandmaster, making him the youngest German ever to achieve this feat. This title was approved by FIDE in early 2020. Keymer said in an interview with Fiona Steil-Antoni that his third grandmaster norm "should have come sooner".

Keymer finished in 5th place in the 2021 FIDE Grand Swiss tournament.

Through February and March 2022, Keymer played in the FIDE Grand Prix 2022. In the first leg, he placed fourth in Pool C with a 1.5/6 result. In the third leg, he tied for first with Shakhriyar Mamedyarov in Pool B with a result of 3.5/6, eventually losing 1/4 in rapid and blitz tiebreakers. He tied for 16th in the standings with 4 points.

In June 2022 Keymer won the Prague Chess Festival Challengers 2022 with a result of 6.5/9 after winning the tiebreaker against Hans Niemann, thus qualifying for the tournament's Masters section next year.

He finished the World Rapid Chess Championship 2022 runner-up after beating Caruana and Nepomniachtchi, scoring 9.5/13 points.

Personal life
Vincent Keymer comes from a musical family.  He plays the piano. His father, Christof Keymer, is a concert pianist and a professor of music at Leibniz University Hannover; his mother, Heike, plays the cello in an orchestra. When he was ten, Keymer was on the September 2015 cover of the German chess magazine Schach Magazin, hailed as Germany's greatest talent since Emanuel Lasker.

References

External links
 
 
  
 
 https://lichess.org/@/VincentKeymer2004

2004 births
Living people
German chess players
Chess grandmasters
Sportspeople from Mainz